Stathmopoda horticola, the orchard featherfoot, is a species of moth in the Stathmopodidae family. It was described by John S. Dugdale in 1988. It is endemic to New Zealand.

References

Moths described in 1988
Stathmopodidae
Moths of New Zealand
Endemic fauna of New Zealand
Endemic moths of New Zealand